Alles may refer to:

Places
 Alles, Asturias, Spain — a parish in the municipality of Peñamellera Alta

People with the surname
 Fred Lind Alles (1851–1945), U.S. businessman and politician
 R. I. T. Alles (1932–2013), Sri Lankan educator and politician
 A. C. Alles (1911–2003), Sri Lankan judge and writer
 Tiran Alles, Sri Lankan businessman and politician
 Dr. Gordon A. Alles, a California chemist, who worked with Smith, Kline & French to develop Benzedrine
 Gustavo Alles (born 1990) Gustavo Javier Alles Vila, Uruguayan footballer

See also
 Über alles (disambiguation)
 Alle (disambiguation)
 All (disambiguation)